The First cabinet of Louis Napoleon was formed by President Louis-Napoleon Bonaparte the day after the coup of 2 December 1851, replacing the Last cabinet of the French Second Republic. It was replaced by the Second cabinet of Louis Napoleon on 22 January 1852. The ministers were:

 Justice : Eugène Rouher
 Foreign Affairs: Louis Félix Étienne, marquis de Turgot
 Interior and Beaux-Arts: Charles de Morny, Duke of Morny
 Finance : Achille Fould
 War: Jacques Leroy de Saint Arnaud
 Navy and Colonies: Théodore Ducos
 Education and Religious Affairs: Hippolyte Fortoul
 Public Works: Pierre Magne
 Agriculture and Commerce: Lefebvre-Duruflé

References

French governments
1851 establishments in France
1852 disestablishments in France
Cabinets established in 1851
Cabinets disestablished in 1852
Napoleon III